Clube Atlético Cristal, commonly referred to as Cristal, is a Brazilian football club based in based in Macapá, Amapá. The club's senior team is inactive since 2013, having last played in a professional match in August 2011.

They competed in the Série C in 2008, and in the Série D in 2009.

History
Clube Atlético Cristal was founded on 15 November 1969 by Aldemir da Silva Figueira from the Santa Rita neighborhood in Macapá, aiming to rival local club  Oratório Recreativo Clube. Soon after, the club became affiliated to the Federação Amapaense de Desportos and began competing in their tournaments. Cristal didn't have much success in the second tier of the state league, winning their first promotion in 1988, beating Lagoa Esporte Clube 5-0 in the final.

They won the Campeonato Amapaense Second Level in 1988 and in 2005, and the Campeonato Amapaense in 2008, when they beat São José in the final. Cristal competed in the Série C in 2008, when they were eliminated in the first stage of the competition, and in the Série D in 2009.

Honours

State 

 Campeonato Amapaense
 Champions (1): 2008
 Runners-up (2): 1995, 2007

 Campeonato Amapaense Segunda Divisão
 Champions (2): 1988, 2005

Notes

References

Further reading

Inactive football clubs in Brazil
Association football clubs established in 1969
Football clubs in Amapá
1969 establishments in Brazil
Macapá